The 1972 North Carolina Tar Heels football team represented the North Carolina Tar Heels of University of North Carolina at Chapel Hill during the 1972 NCAA University Division football season. The team won its second consecutive Atlantic Coast Conference (ACC) championship, going 6–0 in conference play, and played in the 1972 Sun Bowl, defeating Texas Tech by a score of 32–28. The Tar Heels ended the year ranked 12th in the AP Poll with an 11–1 record—the lone loss coming at Ohio State in their fourth game.  This was the first of only four seasons where North Carolina was able to win 11 games.

Schedule

Personnel

Season summary

Ohio State

References

North Carolina
North Carolina Tar Heels football seasons
Atlantic Coast Conference football champion seasons
Sun Bowl champion seasons
North Carolina Tar Heels football